James Stevenson (born March 25, 1981) is an American actor known for portraying Jared Casey on the NBC daytime drama Passions.

On March 14, 2007, Stevenson was nominated for a Daytime Emmy for "Outstanding Younger Actor in a Drama Series" for his role on Passions. He lost to Bryton McClure as Devon Hamilton. Stevenson has since left the series; his last airdate on Passions was July 23, 2007.

Stevenson dated Days of Our Lives star Nadia Bjorlin, who appeared with him on the series Sex, Love & Secrets. He grew up on a horse farm in Tolland, Connecticut.

Selected filmography
Passions .... Jared Casey (2006–2007)
CSI: NY - "Live or Let Die" (2006) TV Episode .... Dwayne Gessner
Sex, Love & Secrets (2005) TV Series .... Hank
Hope & Faith - "Do I Look Frat in This?" (2004) TV Episode .... Beefy Frat Guy

References

External links
 

1981 births
Living people
Male actors from Connecticut
American male soap opera actors
American male television actors
People from Tolland, Connecticut